William Bullokar was a 16th-century printer who devised a 40-letter phonetic alphabet for the English language.  Its characters were in the black-letter or "gothic" writing style commonly used at the time.  Taking as his model a Latin grammar by William Lily, Bullokar wrote the first published grammar of the English language, in a book titled Brief Grammar for English, which appeared in 1586.

Works

 ,
 facsimile edition: 
 facsimile in Bullokar (1977)
 transcription at Plessow (1906), pp. 237-330
 
 transcription at Plessow (1906), pp. 1-212
 
 transcription at Plessow (1906), pp. 213-235
 
 facsimile in Bullokar (1977)
 transcription at Plessow (1906), pp. 331-385
 
 transcription at Plessow (1906), pp. 386-390

See also
 History of English grammars
 English-language spelling reform

Bibliography

References

 Clair, Colin. History of Printing in Bri

English orthography
Linguists of English
Orthographers
16th-century English people
Year of birth missing
Year of death missing